Craig y Llyn (Welsh, 'rock/cliff of the lake') is a mountain situated to the south of the village of Rhigos in the Cynon Valley on the south side of the upper Vale of Neath and north of the Rhondda Valleys in South Wales; it is the highest point in the ancient kingdom and, later, county of Glamorgan (Morgannwg), and the southern Welsh coalfield plateau.

Description
The summit of Craig y Llyn lies within the borough of Neath Port Talbot whilst its eastern slopes are within Rhondda Cynon Taf, the boundary running in a north - south direction  to the east of the summit. The name derives from the sandstone cliffs which drop steeply down to the two lakes on its northern side. Ground on this side (but not the summit) has been designated as a Site of Special Scientific Interest.

The hill is covered by forestry, except for the steep north and northeast faces, and is crowned with a trig point. Several footpaths cross near the summit of the hill, including the Coed Morgannwg Way.  The highest point in Neath Port Talbot, Craig y Llyn, is commonly known as the Rhigos Mountain after the village of Rhigos located on the northern side of the mountain in the Cynon Valley.

The Countryside Council for Wales states that the site has been categorised as a Site of Special Interest because it supports "...two special habitat features, and is also of special interest for a plant, the water lobelia. The first habitat feature is standing water, supporting aquatic plants typical of lakes with low nutrient content. Some of these plants are not known from anywhere further south in the UK. The second is dry heath, found on the slopes above the lakes."

Geology
The hill is composed of a thick sequence of sandstones and mudstones assigned to the South Wales Coal Measures. The summit plateau is formed from the Pennant Sandstone of the Upper Coal Measures. The two cwms on its northern flanks which shelter Llyn Fach and Llyn Fawr are of glacial origin. In fact, the two lakes are the southernmost glacial tarns to occupy cwms in Great Britain. A landslipped mass of rock lies above the western end of the latter lake.

See also
List of Sites of Special Scientific Interest in Mid & South Glamorgan

References

External links
www.geograph.co.uk : photos of Craig y Llyn and surrounding area

Marilyns of Wales
Mountains and hills of Rhondda Cynon Taf
Highest points of Welsh counties
Sites of Special Scientific Interest in Rhondda Cynon Taf